The 2016–17 Superleague is the 26th season of the Ukrainian Men's Handball Super League, Ukrainian's top-tier handball league. A total of eight teams contest this season's league, which began on 2 September 2016 and is scheduled to conclude in May 2017. HC Motor Zaporizhzhia are the defending champions.

Format
The competition format for the 2016–17 season consists of eight teams playing in twice home-and-away round-robin system for a total of 28 games for each team, and following play-off round.

Teams

The following 8 clubs compete in the Superleague during the 2016–17 season.

Standings

Results

Play-off round
 Gold medal matches were not played according to regulations due to the difference between first and second teams was more than five points.
 HC Motor Zaporizhzhia def. ZTR Zaporizhzhia, by default (per regulations)
 Bronze medal matches:
 HC ZNTU-ZAB Zaporizhzhia def. CSKA Kyiv, 18–17 and 20–17.

References

External links
 Superleague

Ukraine
Handball competitions in Ukraine
handball
handball